André Campra (baptized 4 December 1660 – 29 June 1744) was a French composer and conductor of the Baroque era. The leading French opera composer in the period between Jean-Baptiste Lully and Jean-Philippe Rameau, Campra wrote several tragédies en musique and opéra-ballets that were extremely well received. He also wrote three books of cantatas as well as religious music, including a requiem.

Biography
Campra was the son of Giovanni Francesco Campra, a surgeon and violinist from Graglia, Italy, and Louise Fabry, from Aix-en-Provence. His father was his first music teacher. He was baptised on 4 December 1660 in the Église de la Madeleine in Aix. He became a choirboy in the Cathédrale Saint-Sauveur there in 1674 and commenced ecclesiastical studies four years later. He was reprimanded by his superiors in 1681 for having taken part in theatrical performances without permission, but was nevertheless made a chaplain on 27 May of that year.

He served as maître de musique (music director) at the cathedrals of Arles and Toulouse and then, from 1694 to 1700, served in a similar capacity at the cathedral of Notre-Dame de Paris. Campra added violins to the performance of sacred music at the Paris cathedral, a controversial innovation in an era when they were considered street instruments. He began to compose for the theatre in 1697 and published some theatrical compositions under his brother's name to protect his reputation with church authorities. In 1700 he gave up his post at Notre-Dame and devoted himself to theatrical music with critical success. By 1705 he was such a musical celebrity that he became a target for negative articles in the press. In 1720, he adopted the composition of sacred music as his only profession.

Although Campra had obtained critical success he lacked financial security. In 1722 he was engaged briefly as maître de musique by the Prince of Conti. After the death of the regent Philippe d'Orléans in December 1723, Campra became sous-maître at the Royal Chapel in Versailles. In 1730 he became the Inspecteur Général at the Opéra (Royal Academy of Music).

He died in Versailles on 29 June 1744 at the age of 83.

Compositions and style

With his composition of L'Europe galante (1697), he became highly regarded in opéra-ballet, a musical genre originated by Pascal Colasse with Les saisons in 1695.

Principal works

Stage works
 L'Europe galante, opéra-ballet (1697)
 Le carnaval de Venise, opéra-ballet (1699)
 Hésione, tragédie en musique  (1700)
 Aréthuse, opéra-ballet (1701)
 Tancrède, tragédie en musique (1702)
 Les muses, opéra-ballet (1703)
 Iphigénie en Tauride, tragédie en musique (1704)
 Télémaque, tragédie en musique pastiche (1704)
 Alcine, tragédie en musique (1705)
 Hippodamie, tragédie en musique (1708)
 Les fêtes vénitiennes, opéra-ballet (1710)
 Idoménée, tragédie en musique (1712)
 Télèphe, tragédie en musique (1713)
 Énée et Didon, fête musicale (1714)
 Camille, reine des volsques, tragédie en musique (1717)
 Les âges, opéra-ballet (1718)
 Achille et Déidamie, tragédie en musique (1735)

Cantatas
 Book I 1708 – Hebe. L'Heureux jaloux. Didon. Daphne. Arion. Les femmes.
 Book II 1714 – Les Heureux Epoux, Silène, Achille oisif, La Dispute de l'Amour et de l'Hymen, La danse de Flore, Enée et Didon.
 Book III 1728 – L'heureux moment, Les caprices de l'Amour, La colère d'Achille, Les plaisirs de la campagne, Le papillon, Le jaloux, Le lys et la rose

Sacred works
 Nisi Dominus (1722) 
 Requiem (after 1723)
 Motets for the royal chapel (1723–1741)

Legacy
 Darius Milhaud based his 1936 orchestral work Suite provençale on 18th-century themes, including some by Campra.
 A theme from Campra's opera Camille, reine des Volsques (1717) was used as the basis of the collaborative work La guirlande de Campra, a set of variations created by seven French composers in 1952.
 The "Rigaudon" from his opera Idoménée, in an arrangement for organ, is probably his most familiar work, often used as a wedding processional and often recorded.
 The Collège Campra, a state-owned secondary school in the centre of Aix-en-Provence is named for him and houses a statue of him.

References

Additional sources
 Maurice Barthélemy, André Campra: sa vie et son oeuvre (1660–1744) (Éditions A. et J. Picard, 1957)
 Catherine Cessac, ed., Itinéraires d'André Campra (1660–1744) (Editions Mardaga, 2012)
 Jean Duron, André Campra: un musicien provençal à Paris (Editions Mardaga, 2010), available online
 
 Jean-Paul C. Montagnier: The Polyphonic Mass in France, 1600-1780: The Evidence of the Printed Choirbooks, Cambridge: Cambridge University Press, 2017.

External links

 
 

1660 births
1744 deaths
18th-century classical composers
18th-century French composers
18th-century French male musicians
French ballet composers
French Baroque composers
French male classical composers
French composers of sacred music
French opera composers
French people of Italian descent
Male opera composers
People from Aix-en-Provence
17th-century male musicians